Vacanze di Natale '91 is a 1991 Italian comedy film directed by Enrico Oldoini.

Cast

Reception
The film grossed $7.4 million in Italy and was the second-highest-grossing Italian film in Italy in 1992.

See also
 List of Christmas films

References

External links

1991 films
Films directed by Enrico Oldoini
1990s Italian-language films
1991 comedy films
1990s Christmas comedy films
Italian Christmas comedy films
1990s Italian films